Wanted Dead or Alive is an album by David Bromberg. It was his third album, released by Columbia Records as a vinyl LP in 1974. It has been released as a CD several times − by Sony Music Media in 2004, by SBME Special Markets in 2008, and by Columbia Records in 2011. It was also released as a double CD, combined with Bromberg's subsequent album Midnight on the Water, by BGO Records in 2010.

The title Wanted Dead or Alive is a play on words, referring to how the record was created. Side one of the LP was recorded in the studio with various musicians, including four members of the Grateful Dead − Jerry Garcia, Phil Lesh, Keith Godchaux and Bill Kreutzmann. Side two was recorded live.

Critical reception

Writing in Driftwood Magazine in 2011, Craig Harris said: "With their masterfully executed mix of America’s musical roots, the albums released by David Bromberg in the mid-1970s remain as much fun as they were more than a third of a century ago.... Reaching into what he does best, Bromberg came up with an album full of spirit, high energy and musical diversity. Opening with a galloping reprisal of "The Holdup", his collaboration with George Harrison, Bromberg and cohorts... rarely let up. While his vocals were anything but luscious, Bromberg's deep, growl-like singing made every word heartfelt. Showing the depths of his songwriting with four self-composed tunes... Bromberg uses the guitar picking styles that he had learned as a student and protégé of bluesman Reverend Gary Davis as springboards for discovery."

According to AllMusic, "Some of Bromberg's strongest and best-loved material can be found here, including "The Holdup", "Danger Man", "Send Me to the 'Lectric Chair", "The New Lee Highway Blues" and Bob Dylan's "Wallflower"."

Track listing
Side one:
"The Holdup" (David Bromberg, George Harrison) – 3:03
"Someone Else's Blues" (Bromberg) – 8:00
"Danger Man" (Bromberg) – 3:05
"The Main Street Moan" (Bromberg) – 5:13
Side two:
"Send Me to the 'Lectric Chair" (George Brooks) – 4:52
"Statesboro Blues" / "Church Bell Blues" (Blind Willie McTell / Luke Jordan, arranged by Bromberg) – 5:08
"Wallflower" (Bob Dylan) – 2:57
"Kansas City" (Jerry Leiber, Mike Stoller) – 3:57
"The New Lee Highway Blues" (Bromberg) – 5:40

Personnel

Musicians
David Bromberg – acoustic and electric guitar, lead vocals
Steve Burgh – bass
Peter Ecklund – trumpet, mellophone
Joe Ferguson – alto and baritone saxophone
Hungria Garcia – timbales
Jerry Garcia – acoustic and electric guitar
Keith Godchaux – piano
Jeff Gutcheon – piano
Bill Kreutzmann – drums
Phil Lesh – bass
Tony Markellis – bass
Steve Mosley – bass
John Payne – alto flute, bass clarinet, tenor saxophone
Neil Rossi – fiddle
Andy Statman – mandolin, tenor saxophone
Jay Ungar – fiddle
Winnie Winston – banjo
Jack Lee  – background vocals
Andy McMahon – background vocals
Tracy Nelson – background vocals
The Sweet Inspirations – background vocals

Production
Produced by: David Bromberg
Production coordinator: George Eichen
Horn arrangements on "Danger Man" and "Kansas City": Peter Ecklund
Engineer, side 1: David Brown
Engineers, side 2: Buddy Graham, Jerry Smith, Pete Weiss, Frank Laico
Tape recordists: Louis Waxman, Lehman Yates
Remix engineer: Tim Geelan
Mastered by: Jack Ashkinazy
Photography: Jim McGuire
Album design: Karen Lee Grant
Cover concept: Tony Markellis

References

David Bromberg albums
1974 albums
Columbia Records albums